Dreams and Shadows is a 2009 American drama film written and directed by Tamarat Makonnen in his feature film debut. The film stars James Russo and Shawn-Caulin Young.  Dreams and Shadows had its world premiere in Los Angeles California at the American Film Institute on October 2, 2009.

Plot
Billy (Shawn-Caulin Young), a teenage outcast drifts into his own vivid imagination to escape his bleak surroundings. His father (James Russo) is a paraplegic whose own dreams of happiness have faded away in an alcoholic haze. In a twisted attempt to find his purpose in life, the teen hatches a plot to seek vengeance on the man who allegedly crippled his father many years ago. However, he soon finds that things aren't always what they seem, as his mission for revenge may ultimately become one for his very own survival.

Cast
 James Russo as John Brunette
 Shawn-Caulin Young as Billy Brunette
 Yoshi Ando as Samurai
 Kathy Christopherson as Krissy
 Julie Clark as Lorrie Brunette
 Joseph Darden as Tommy
 Robert Dolan as Lester
 Natalie Garcia Fryman as Sarah
 James Gibler as Twiggy
 Sean Ridgway as Spike
 Londale Theus as Eddie Vincent
 Cody Hamilton as Young Billy
 Mary Mackey as Prostitute

Critical reception
The film was given a rating of 3 out of 5 stars by We are Movie Geeks, who noted that the essence of Dreams and Shadows is "strong" with the film appearing to be something between a "dramatic soap opera and a pulp film noir". They also mentioned that "There are elements of classic storytelling that linger just beneath the surface of Dreams and Shadows, from Oedipus Rex to MacBeth".

Home media
Dreams and Shadows was released on DVD October 12, 2010. It was distributed in the US and Canada by E1 Entertainment/Synkronized, and includes the behind the scenes featurette The Making of Dreams and Shadows.

References

External links
 
 
 Dreams and Shadows at Allmovie

2009 films
American coming-of-age drama films
American teen drama films
Films about alcoholism
2009 directorial debut films
2000s English-language films
2000s American films